TransAer International Airlines was an Irish charter airline headquartered in the TransAer House, Dublin Airport, Dublin, Ireland.

History
The airline was previously known as Translift Airways. It was established in October 1991 and started operations in February 1992. Renaming took place on 10 April 1997. It was the brainchild of P. J. McGoldrick (who later went on to run Ryanair and EUjet).

The airline operated a number of Airbus A300B4 and Airbus A320-200 aircraft. Some Boeing 727, Boeing 757 and Boeing 737-200 were also operated for a short period of time. The company leased aircraft to Libyan Arab Airlines and Khalifa Airways.

TransAer went into liquidation on 20 October 2000. Prior to the collapse, an 18-month contract was signed in 2000 to help set up a new airline in Kosovo. The collapse was blamed on the adverse effects of the Kosovo war, a failed $18 million investment in American airline TransMeridian and losses of $14 million incurred by TransAer's German and Greek charter airline business.  The business failed with outstanding debts of £30 million and made 450 employees redundant.

Two of their aircraft were impounded in Ireland by Aer Rianta the day after the airline appointed a liquidator, due to TransAer's failure pay landing and handling fees amounting to over £200,000.

See also
 List of defunct airlines of the United Kingdom

References

External links

Defunct airlines of the Republic of Ireland
Airlines established in 1992
Airlines disestablished in 2000
Irish companies established in 1992
2000 disestablishments in Ireland